Kvasyliv is an urban-type settlement in Rivne Raion (district) of Rivne Oblast (province) in western Ukraine. Population:  Kvasyliv was first founded in 1445, and it acquired the status of an urban-type settlement in 1959.

See also
 Klevan, Orzhiv, the other two urban-type settlements in Rivne Raion of Rivne Oblast

References

Urban-type settlements in Rivne Raion
Populated places established in the 1440s